Riba is an Arabic word meaning usury.

Riba or RIBA may also refer to:
 Riba (surname)
 La Riba, a municipality in Catalonia, north-eastern Spain
 Royal Institute of British Architects
 RIBA International Award
 RIBA Journal
 Recombinant ImmunoBlot Assay, a technique used in immunogenetics to detect specific proteins in a sample of tissue. It is also known as the Western Blot test

See also
 
 Ribas (disambiguation)
 Reba (disambiguation)